26th meridian may refer to:

26th meridian east, a line of longitude east of the Greenwich Meridian
26th meridian west, a line of longitude west of the Greenwich Meridian